The Battle of Rio de Janeiro or the Battle of Guanabara Bay was a battle on 20 January 1567 at Rio de Janeiro that ended with the definitive defeat of the French. Specifically, the battle was an attack on the fortification of Uruçú-mirim. The Portuguese commander, Estácio de Sá, was hit by an arrow which perforated his eye, and died on 20 February.

Notes

External links

1560s in Brazil
1567 in South America
Rio de Janeiro
Rio de Janeiro
Rio de Janeiro
Colonial Brazil
Conflicts in 1567
History of Rio de Janeiro (city)
Military history of Brazil
Portuguese colonization of the Americas

nn:Slaget ved Rio de Janeiro